Soner Karagöz (born 3 January 1972) is a Turkish boxer. He competed in the men's bantamweight event at the 1996 Summer Olympics.

References

1972 births
Living people
Turkish male boxers
Olympic boxers of Turkey
Boxers at the 1996 Summer Olympics
Place of birth missing (living people)
Mediterranean Games gold medalists for Turkey
Mediterranean Games medalists in boxing
Competitors at the 1997 Mediterranean Games
AIBA World Boxing Championships medalists
Bantamweight boxers
20th-century Turkish people